Hawes Township is a civil township of Alcona County in the U.S. state of Michigan.  The population was 1,107 at the 2010 census.

Communities 
Backus Beach is included in the Hubbard Lake CDP.
Most of the community is within the northern portion of Millen Township to the south.
The Hubbard Lake CDP also extends into Alcona Township and Caledonia Township.
Lincoln is a village located in the southeast corner of the township. The village also extends into Gustin Township to the south.

Geography

The southern portion of Hubbard Lake is within Hawes Township.

Major highways
 is a county-designated highway that forms the eastern boundary of the township.

Demographics

As of the census of 2000, there were 1,167 people, 528 households, and 353 families residing in the township.  The population density was 16.7 per square mile (6.4/km2).  There were 1,003 housing units at an average density of 14.3 per square mile (5.5/km2).  The racial makeup of the township was 98.71% White, 0.17% African American, 0.69% Native American, and 0.43% from two or more races. Hispanic or Latino of any race were 0.69% of the population.

There were 528 households, out of which 21.4% had children under the age of 18 living with them, 56.3% were married couples living together, 6.8% had a female householder with no husband present, and 33.0% were non-families. 29.5% of all households were made up of individuals, and 15.5% had someone living alone who was 65 years of age or older.  The average household size was 2.20 and the average family size was 2.64.

In the township the population was spread out, with 19.6% under the age of 18, 3.5% from 18 to 24, 23.5% from 25 to 44, 32.0% from 45 to 64, and 21.3% who were 65 years of age or older.  The median age was 47 years. For every 100 females, there were 95.8 males.  For every 100 females age 18 and over, there were 91.8 males.

The median income for a household in the township was $28,938, and the median income for a family was $36,736. Males had a median income of $31,346 versus $21,538 for females. The per capita income for the township was $16,332.  About 10.0% of families and 12.2% of the population were below the poverty line, including 17.8% of those under age 18 and 4.6% of those age 65 or over.

Education
Hawes Township is served entirely by Alcona Community Schools.

References

External links
Hawes Township official website

Townships in Alcona County, Michigan
Townships in Michigan